Train Mountain Railroad is the world's largest miniature hobbyist railroad near Chiloquin, Oregon, in Klamath County, which is in the south central region of Oregon.
Physical Location: 36941 South Chiloquin Road, Chiloquin, OR 97624,  USA.

Geography
The approximately  property borders Highway 97 on the east side, Highway 62 (Crater Lake Highway) on the west side, and Highway 422 on the north.  The track and facilities which are not obscured by trees are clearly visible on public satellite images.

Longest miniature hobby railroad

In the 2004 Guinness World Records, Train Mountain is recognized as the “Longest Miniature Hobby Railroad”. During the following years, approximately 10 additional miles (16 km) of new track has been added.

Gauge and scale

The Train Mountain  gauge miniature railway track is typically used for 1.5" scale trains (1.5" to 12" or approx. 1/8 scale). Trains of 2.5" scale (2.5" to 12", or approx. 1/5 scale) are also common at Train Mountain.

Live steam

Train Mountain is well known to members of the live steam hobby who visit regularly from all over the world.

Media coverage

Train Mountain was featured on Oregon Public Broadcasting 2005 video on Train Mountain and "The Dream."  "The Dream" refers to  late founder of Train Mountain, Quentin Breen, whose dream was to build the railroad at Train Mountain as explained in the video.

Train Mountain was again featured on OPB Oregon Field Guide in the fall of 2017.

Garden railway

Midway Circle is one of several such circles, which are essentially roundabouts.

Train Mountain Railroad Museum

Train Mountain Railroad Museum  also exists on the Train Mountain property, and consists of antique full size railroad rolling stock and artifacts which are on display. One of the most notable is the  antique, steam-powered, rotary snow blower or rotary snowplow, SP MW206, built by ALCo (Cooke), 11/1923, #65353, that was used to remove snow from the track between Klamath Falls and Eugene, Oregon. The rotary snow blower was moved to Train Mountain on November 16, 2008.

Train meets

The 25th anniversary of the founding of Train Mountain was celebrated during the summer of 2012.  The celebration featured an international miniature train meet entitled the "2012 Triennial." The Train Mountain tradition of Triennials began in the year 2000, and has been held every three years thereafter. The 2018 Triennial attracted trains which totaled more than 10,000 feet in length.  The 2022 Triennial has approx. 888 participants, a drop of about 20% from 2018, but more trains than in 2018.  The high point of the Triennial is the Big Toot in which all trains assemble on the last Saturday and blow their whistles for one minute.  Participants from Australia, Switzerland, Canada, Germany, UK, and the US are attending.  A specific entrance donation is requested from visitors only during the Triennial event week.

Other train meets for members and those who own, operate, or have an interest in  gauge railroading are held seven times a year.  These events attract participants from all over the US and Canada. They are popular with live steam enthusiasts due to the uniqueness of the layout, and the ability to operate heavy steam powered locomotives that may not be allowed at other railroads.

Visitors

Train Mountain is a club and museum, not an amusement park, so it does not offer "rides."  Volunteer members do, though, offer "tours" which are train rides which may vary from 30 minutes to eight hours in length.  On the longer tours, the group will still not see all of the Train Mountain track.  The club often provides 30-minute tours on a regular schedule weekdays from 10 AM to 3 PM during the summer (the gate opens at 9 AM) and 11 AM to 2 PM during the off season.  For the more-extensive tours, ask any train operator, or schedule a tour with the Train Mountain Office.  Tours may be offered on Train Mountain-owned or member-owned equipment.  A guide to walking among the historic full-sized museum equipment is available on request.  There is no charge for admission, but donations are gratefully accepted to enable maintenance and expansion.

Klamath & Western Railroad

Free public train rides are available at Klamath & Western Railroad (K&WRR) on Saturdays from Memorial Day to Labor Day. The K&WRR is a 501(c)3 non-profit public benefit corporation, which is located directly east and adjacent to Train Mountain on South Chiloquin Road.

Klamath & Western Railroad existed prior to the founding of Train Mountain under the name of "Over The Hill Live Steamers" which was a result of being referred to as being over the hill from the Medford Live Steamers (Southern Oregon Live Steamers),) since to get there one had to traverse the Oregon Cascade Mountain Range.

Klamath & Western Railroad has several antique railroad items on display, including the antique Train Order Semaphore Signal, originally used at the Southern Pacific Station in Junction City, Oregon.

Technology

Train Mountain features a Central Train Control or centralized traffic control ("CTC"), a computer controlled switching and signal system. The status of this system can be viewed online at the Friends of Train Mountain website.

References

External links
 Train Mountain Railroad Museum - official site

7½ in gauge railways in the United States
Rail transport modelling
Live steam
Steam museums in the United States
Railroad museums in Oregon
Transportation museums in Oregon
Rail transportation in Oregon
Museums in Klamath County, Oregon
Heritage railroads in Oregon